John Wodehouse, 1st Baron Wodehouse (4 April 1741 – 29 May 1834), known as Sir John Wodehouse, 6th Baronet, from 1777 to 1797, was a British landowner, Member of Parliament and peer.

Life
Wodehouse was the son of Sir Armine Wodehouse, 5th Baronet, and Letitia Bacon. He succeeded his father in the baronetcy in 1777 and in 1784 he was elected to the House of Commons for Norfolk, a seat he held until 1797. In that year, he was raised to the peerage as Baron Wodehouse, of Kimberley in the County of Norfolk.

In 1778, Wodehouse commissioned Capability Brown, to undertake a series of enhancements to his country seat, Kimberley Hall near Wymondham (Brown had previously undertaken works for Sir Armine in 1762). By 1827, Woodhouse had developed a pleasure ground, a southwards extension to the park and three lodged entrances. The landscape which Wodehouse created has largely survived and is listed Grade II*. Wodehouse died in May 1834 aged 93, and was succeeded in his titles by his eldest son.

Personal life
Wodehouse married Sophia  Berkeley (died 16 April 1825), daughter of Charles Berkeley of Bruton Abbey, on 30 March 1769. Together the couple had four sons and two daughters:
John Wodehouse, 2nd Baron Wodehouse (11 January 1771 – 29 May 1846)
Vice-Admiral Philip Wodehouse (16 July 1773 – 21 January 1838), Royal Navy officer
Reverend Armine Wodehouse (12 March 1776 – 9 April 1853), clergyman
Reverend William Wodehouse (4 April 1782 – 3 April 1870), clergyman
Sophia Wodehouse (d. 22 June 1852), unmarried
Letitia Wodehouse (d. 3 March 1864), married firstly Sir Thomas Maynard Hesilrige, 10th Baronet and secondly F. Fielding, barrister

Citations

References

External links

www.thepeerage.com

1741 births
1834 deaths
11
British MPs 1784–1790
British MPs 1790–1796
British MPs 1796–1800
Members of the Parliament of Great Britain for Norfolk
John Wodehouse, 1st Baron Wodehouse
Peers of Great Britain created by George III